Brigitta Games (born February 9, 1995) is an American water polo player.

College career

Games attended University of Southern California, playing on the women's water polo team from 2015 to 2017 and winning the NCAA in 2016.

International career

Games has competed on both the junior and senior national teams for the U.S. national team winning the gold medal at 2017 and 2018 FINA World League.

References

American female water polo players
Living people
1995 births
Universiade medalists in water polo
Universiade gold medalists for the United States
Medalists at the 2017 Summer Universiade
21st-century American women
USC Trojans women's water polo players